Army Service Corps may refer to:

Army Service Corps, a corps of the British Army which existed from 1870 to 1881 and again from 1888 to 1918, after which it was known as the Royal Army Service Corps until 1965
Army Service Corps, a component of the Services of Supply, American Expeditionary Forces during World War I
Indian Army Service Corps, a logistics arm of the Indian Army
Pakistan Army Service Corps, a logistics and transport Crops of the Pakistan Army
Royal Australian Army Service Corps
Royal Canadian Army Service Corps
Sri Lanka Army Service Corps
United States Army Services of Supply, a branch of the United States Army created World War II and later renamed to the Army Service Forces